Do Unto Others is a 1915 British silent drama film directed by Bert Haldane and starring Thomas H. MacDonald, Peggy Richards and Patrick J. Noonan.

Cast
 Thomas H. MacDonald as Curley  
 Peggy Richards as Renee  
 Patrick J. Noonan as Steve  
 Pippin Barker as Curley as a Child  
 Connie Barnes as Renee as a Child 
 Willie Harris as Steve as a Child

References

Bibliography
 Low, Rachael. The History of British Film, Volume III: 1914-1918. Routledge, 1997.

External links

1915 films
1915 drama films
British silent feature films
British drama films
Films directed by Bert Haldane
British black-and-white films
1910s English-language films
1910s British films
Silent drama films